The Mentawai macaque or Mentawai island macaque may refer to:

 Pagai Island macaque, Macaca pagensis (on the islands of North Pagai, South Pagai and Sipora)
 Siberut macaque, Macaca siberu (on the island of Siberut)

Animal common name disambiguation pages